The Vienna Convention on the Law of Treaties (VCLT) is a treaty concerning the international law on treaties between states. It was adopted on 22 May 1969 and opened for signature on 23 May 1969. The Convention entered into force on 27 January 1980.

As of January 2018, 116 state parties have ratified the convention, and a further 15 states have signed but have not ratified the convention. When the PRC subsequently acceded to the Convention, they described the Republic of China's (ROC) signature as "illegal". 64 UN member states have neither signed nor ratified the Convention.

List of parties

List of signatories that have not ratified

Partially recognized state 
When the PRC subsequently acceded the treaty, they described the Republic of China's (ROC) signature as "illegal".

Non-signatory states

References

Lists of parties to treaties
United Nations treaties
Treaty law